This is a list of public art on permanent public display in Dublin, Ireland. The list applies only to works of public art accessible in a public space; it does not include artwork on display inside museums. Public art may include sculptures, statues, monuments, memorials, murals and mosaics.

Public art in Dublin is a significant feature of the cityscape. The city's statues and other monuments have a long history of controversy about their subjects and designs, and a number of formerly prominent monuments have been removed or destroyed. Some of the city's monuments have nicknames, though many are not in popular use.

North city centre

O'Connell Street

North Quays

City North East
This area of the city is bounded to the west by O'Connell Street, Parnell Square East, North Frederick Street, and Lower Dorset Street. To the north it is bounded by the Royal Canal, and to the south by the Liffey Quays. To the east it includes the North Wall.

City North West
This area of the city is bounded to the east by O'Connell Street, Parnell Square East, North Frederick Street, and Lower Dorset Street. To the north and west it is bounded by the North Circular Road and to the south by the Liffey Quays.

South city centre

Trinity College

St. Stephen's Green

Merrion Square Park

Iveagh Gardens

South Quays

City South East
This area of the city is bounded to the west by Westmoreland Street, Trinity College, Grafton Street, St. Stephens Green West, and Harcourt Street. To the north it is bounded by the Liffey Quays, and to the south by the Grand Canal. To the east it includes Irishtown and Ringsend. Locations within this area with their own article subsections such as St. Stephen's Green are excluded.

City South West
This area of the city is bounded to the east by Westmoreland Street, Trinity College, Grafton Street, St. Stephens Green West, and Harcourt Street. To the north it is bounded by the Liffey Quays, and to the south by the Grand Canal. To the west it is bounded by the South Circular Road.

Northside suburbs

Phoenix Park

Farmleigh

Glasnevin Cemetery

National Botanic Gardens, Glasnevin

Southside suburbs

University College Dublin

North County Dublin

South County Dublin

Dún Laoghaire

Past public art

Notes

See also

List of public art in Belfast
List of public art in Cork city
List of public art in Galway city
List of public art in Limerick

References

External links
Poem: Our Statues Go Unwatched, Katie Martin, The Irish Times 5 July 2020. Retrieved 6 July 2020
 Talking Statues retrieved 26 July 2021

Bibliography
 Neal Doherty, 'The Complete Guide to the Statues and Sculptures of Dublin City', Dublin, 2015, 

Buildings and structures in Dublin (city)
Monuments and memorials in the Republic of Ireland
Outdoor sculptures in Ireland
Dublin
Public art
Public art